Ella Wallace Raines (August 6, 1920 – May 30, 1988) was an American film and television actress active from the early 1940s through the mid-1950s.  Described as "sultry" and "mysterious", the green-eyed star appeared frequently in crime pictures and film noir, but also in drama, comedy, Westerns, thrillers, and romance.

Among the leading men she starred with were John Wayne, Charles Laughton, William Powell, Randolph Scott, Franchot Tone, Brian Donlevy, and Burt Lancaster.  When film roles dwindled she turned to television.  Her second marriage was to famed World War II double-ace fighter pilot - later a triple, brigadier general, and commandant of the United States Air Force Academy - Robin Olds.

Raines appeared as a pin-up girl in the June 2 and June 16, 1944, issues of the G.I. magazine Yank, and on the cover of Life magazine twice, in 1944 for her work in Phantom Lady, and in 1947 for Brute Force.

Early life
Raines was born Ella Wallace Raines on August 6, 1920, in Snoqualmie Falls, Washington.  She studied drama at the University of Washington and was appearing in a play there when she was seen by director Howard Hawks. She achieved stardom almost overnight in Hollywood when she was made the sole contract star of a $1-million new production company he had formed in 1943 with the actor Charles Boyer, B-H Productions.  She immediately made her film debut in Corvette K-225 (1943), which Hawks produced.

Acting career

Film

Immediately following her debut in Corvette K-225, opposite Randolph Scott, Raines was cast in the all-female war film Cry "Havoc" (also 1943). She starred in the film noir Phantom Lady with Franchot Tone, the Preston Sturges comedy Hail the Conquering Hero, and the John Wayne western Tall in the Saddle (all 1944).

Still in 1944 she appeared in the unusual Edwardian noir The Suspect opposite Charles Laughton, then starred in films such as the romantic suspense The Strange Affair of Uncle Harry (1945) with Geraldine Fitzgerald and George Sanders, the thriller The Web (1947) with Edmond O'Brien, and the prison drama Brute Force (1947) with Burt Lancaster.  Some regard all of these as noirs.

Also in 1947 she starred in the comedy The Senator Was Indiscreet with William Powell.  In 1949 she starred opposite Brian Donlevy in the noirish Impact, then took the lead role originally intended for Jean Wallace in the noir A Dangerous Profession, as Wallace  had made a suicide attempt following her divorce from Franchot Tone.  None of her later pictures were nearly as successful as her earlier movies and her film career began to decline.

Following some years in television her final film role was starring as the female lead in a British-made thriller The Man in the Road in 1956; but for a single late-life TV appearance in the 1980s she retired from acting altogether the following year.

Television
In 1954 and 1955 she starred in the television series Janet Dean, Registered Nurse.  She also appeared in such television series as Robert Montgomery Presents, Douglas Fairbanks, Jr., Presents, Lights Out, Pulitzer Prize Playhouse and The Christophers.

After a nearly three decade hiatus, Raines' final appearance as an actress was in a guest role in the crime drama series Matt Houston in 1984.

Personal life

On August 11, 1942, a few days after her graduation from the University of Washington, Raines married her high school sweetheart, United States Army Air Forces Major Kenneth William Trout. The couple divorced December 18, 1945.

On February 6, 1947, Raines married then double-ace World War II fighter pilot Robin Olds, who went on to become a triple-ace during the Vietnam War, was eventually promoted to United States Air Force brigadier general, and served as commandant of the United States Air Force Academy from 1967 to 1971.  The couple had three children, daughters Christina and Susan,  and a stillborn. She also had two miscarriages which she blamed on the unsanitary conditions of serving abroad in Africa. They separated in 1975 and divorced in 1976.

Known for her traditional family values, Raines was quoted at the height of her Hollywood career extolling them: "I am naturally captivated with the rewards that Hollywood bestows on those who are successful,” she said at the height of her career. “But I’m going to do my best to see that these (rewards) never disturb the essential values in my life--love of husband, family, home; the things that really count."

Raines adored John Wayne, a noted conservative and anti-communist, and was married to a WWII flying hero who rose to general during their marriage, earning the Air Force Cross, Distinguished Flying Cross, the U.S. Legion of Merit, British Distinguished Flying Cross, and French Croix de Guerre, among numerous other military awards.  She was a  Republican who supported Dwight Eisenhower, Richard Nixon, Gerald Ford and Ronald Reagan in their presidential elections. 

She died from throat cancer in Sherman Oaks, California in 1988, aged 67.

Legacy
Raines has two stars on the Hollywood Walk of Fame, for her contribution to motion pictures at 7021 Hollywood Boulevard, and for television at 6600 Hollywood Boulevard.

Filmography

References

External links

 
 
 
 Screen Sirens - Ella Raines photo gallery
 Movie Maidens - brief biography and more photographs of Ella Raines
 Ella Raines at aenigma

1920 births
1988 deaths
People from King County, Washington
20th-century American actresses
American film actresses
American television actresses
Washington (state) Republicans
California Republicans
University of Washington School of Drama alumni
Deaths from cancer in California
Deaths from esophageal cancer
Actresses from Washington (state)